Pietro Rava (21 January 1916 – 5 November 2006) was an Italian football defender and coach, who played as a full-back. He won the 1936 Summer Olympics and the 1938 FIFA World Cup with the Italy national team.

Club career
Rava, born in Cassine, Province of Alessandria, played for the clubs U.S. Alessandria (1928–35, 1946–47), Juventus F.C. (1935–46 and 1947–50) and Novara Calcio (1950–51). He won two Italian Cups in the 1937–38 and 1941–42 seasons, and two scudetti in the 1934–35 and 1949–50 seasons. He was Juventus's captain from 1947 to 1950. In total, he played in 352 Serie A matches (including 303 for Juventus), scoring 15 goals.

International career
Rava appeared in 30 international matches with the Italy national team between 1935 and 1946, losing only one game, and becoming the Italy captain in 1940. He won the gold medal at the 1936 Summer Olympics, and won the 1938 FIFA World Cup. Rumour has it, before the 1938 finals fascist Italian Prime Minister Benito Mussolini was to have sent a telegram to the team, saying "Vincere o morire!" (literally translated as "Win or die!"). However, no record remains of such a telegram, and Rava said, when interviewed, "No, no, no, that's not true. He sent a telegram wishing us well, but no never 'win or die'." He was selected to the "Best XI" of the 1938 World Cup. Along with Alfredo Foni, Sergio Bertoni, and Ugo Locatelli, Rava is one of only four Italian players ever to win both the Olympic tournament and the World Cup.

After retirement
As a coach, he managed the clubs Sampdoria, Palermo, Padova, Monza, Alessandria, Novara, Carrarese, and A.C. Cuneo.

On 5 November 2006, Rava, the last surviving member of the 1938 World Cup champion squad, died in Turin after having had surgery on his right femur due to a fracture days before. He had been suffering from Alzheimer's disease for several years. Juventus announced that the following day, for a Serie B match against Napoli, the players would wear mourning armbands in his memory.

He was the last surviving member of the 1938 FIFA World Cup Italy squad.

Honours

Club
Juventus
 Serie A: 1949–50; Runner-up: 1937–38, 1946–47
 Serie A-B Runner-up: 1945–46
 Coppa Italia: 1937–38, 1941–42

International
Italy
 Olympic Gold Medal: 1936
 FIFA World Cup: 1938

Individual
 1938 FIFA World Cup All-star Team

References

Further reading
Player bio - www.tifonet.it - Retrieved November 2006. 
Rava's statistics at Juventus - www.myjuve.it - Retrieved November 2006.
Pietro Rava - International Appearances - www.rsssf.com - by Roberto Di Maggio, RSSSF.

is stated as fact:
website FIFA  in November 2009 introduced some changes in date of birth the player's instead 21 January 1916 (originally written) wrote 12 January 1916

1916 births
2006 deaths
Accidental deaths from falls
Italian footballers
Italy international footballers
Association football defenders
U.S. Alessandria Calcio 1912 players
Juventus F.C. players
Novara F.C. players
Olympic footballers of Italy
Olympic gold medalists for Italy
Footballers at the 1936 Summer Olympics
1938 FIFA World Cup players
FIFA World Cup-winning players
Italian football managers
U.C. Sampdoria managers
Palermo F.C. managers
Calcio Padova managers
A.C. Monza managers
U.S. Alessandria Calcio 1912 managers
Novara F.C. managers
Carrarese Calcio managers
A.C. Cuneo 1905 managers
People from Cassine, Piedmont
Olympic medalists in football
Medalists at the 1936 Summer Olympics
People with Alzheimer's disease
Footballers from Piedmont
Sportspeople from the Province of Alessandria